Volodymyr Pavlovsky (born 14 April 1980 in Kiev) is a Ukrainian rower who competes in the men's quadruple sculls.  He has competed at two Olympics and eight world championships, winning the silver medal in 2006, in a team with Dymtro Prokopenko, Sergiy Bilouschenko and Sergii Gryn.

References 

 
 

1980 births
Living people
Ukrainian male rowers
Sportspeople from Kyiv
Olympic rowers of Ukraine
Rowers at the 2008 Summer Olympics
Rowers at the 2012 Summer Olympics

World Rowing Championships medalists for Ukraine